Luiz Fernando de Almeida da Silva (born 14 January 1986 in Campo Grande), known as Da Silva Buiu, is a Brazilian footballer who currently plays as a left back for Teuta Durrës in the Albanian Superliga.

References

1986 births
Living people
Brazilian footballers
Kategoria Superiore players
Association football defenders
KF Teuta Durrës players
KF Apolonia Fier players
People from Campo Grande
Sportspeople from Mato Grosso do Sul